Pavle Kiš (Serbian Cyrillic: Павле Киш; 8 July 1940 – 28 November 2018) was a Serbian footballer.

External links
 
 
 Profile and photo at Hertha official site

1940 births
2018 deaths
Serbian footballers
Yugoslav footballers
FK Partizan players
Grazer AK players
Austrian Football Bundesliga players
Expatriate footballers in Austria
Hertha BSC players
Expatriate footballers in Germany
PSV Eindhoven players
Expatriate footballers in the Netherlands
Bayer 04 Leverkusen players
Sportfreunde Siegen players
NK Maribor players
Association football forwards